Conduct Unbecoming is a 1975 British drama film, an adaptation of the Barry England play Conduct Unbecoming, first staged in 1969. It was directed by Michael Anderson and starred an ensemble cast of actors including Michael York, Susannah York, Richard Attenborough and Trevor Howard.

Plot
Around 1880, two young British officers arrive to join a regiment in India. One, Lieutenant Drake (Michael York), from a middle-class background, is extremely eager to fit in while the other, Lieutenant Millington (James Faulkner), the son of a general, is keen to get out as soon as possible and deliberately antagonizes his fellow officers. The two newcomers learn the traditions of the regiment, one of which is a mess game in which they chase a wooden pig on wheels, attempting to pierce its anus with their swords.

Mrs Scarlett (Susannah York), the flirtatious and attractive widow of a captain who was posthumously awarded the Victoria Cross, is a constant presence in the regiment.  One night at a mess dance, Millington gets drunk and tries to seduce Mrs Scarlett in the garden. She repels him, but moments later runs back into the mess wounded and in shock, claiming the culprit was Millington. An informal court martial – more a mock trial than anything else – is organised with Drake ordered to be Millington's defending officer. Although Drake is pressured by his superior officer to plead guilty for Millington and close the case quickly, he begins to challenge the orders in order to give the defendant a fair trial. Drake learns from an Indian servant that another widow suffered a similar attack with a sword six months earlier, before he and Millington joined. After irrefutable evidence, Mrs Scarlett finally admits it was not Millington who attacked her but will not say who the culprit is. Millington, now indisputably proved innocent, is welcomed back by his brother officers; but Drake, disgusted by the truth he's uncovered, resigns. One officer knows who the culprit is and, hiding Drake in the shadows so he may witness what is to take place, confronts the guilty man privately in the final scene.

Cast
 Michael York as Lieutenant Drake
 Richard Attenborough as Major Roach
 Trevor Howard as Colonel Strang
 Stacy Keach as Captain Harper
 Christopher Plummer as Major Wimbourne
 Susannah York as Mrs Scarlett
 James Faulkner as Lieutenant Millington
 James Donald as the doctor
 Michael Culver as Lieutenant Fothergill
 Persis Khambatta as Mrs. Bandanai
 Helen Cherry as Mrs. Strang
 Michael Fleming as Lieutenant Frank Hart 
 David Robb as 2nd Lieutenant  Winters 
 David Purcell as 2nd Lieutenant  Boulton 
 Andrew Lodge as 2nd Lieutenant  Hutton 
 David Neville as 2nd Lieutenant  Truly 
 Michael Byrne as 2nd Lieutenant Toby Strang
 Jamila Massey as Servant

Production
Barry England's play premiered in 1969 and had a short run on Broadway the following year.

The film was greenlit by Michael Deeley who had recently become managing director of British Lion Films, and was part financed through a US tax deal. Deeley said there had been a number of screenplays written, including one by Terence Rattigan which Deeley says cost £250,000. He said all of them "failed to crack the adaptation" but there was "a very simple solution, which was to go back to the stage play and strip out as much extraneous dialogue as possible. Robert Enders delivered a perfect screenplay by these means."

Deeley hired Michael Anderson to direct, in part because he was efficient, and the film was shot at Shepperton Studios over four weeks starting mid November 1974. This meant the filmmakers have five weeks before the studio shut down over Christmas.  Deeley says "the picture ran like clockwork". The veteran Elizabeth Haffenden designed the costumes in her final film production.

Reception
Deeley says the film was "well made, at the right price and completely fulfilling British Lion's objective – to make money".

Film critic John Simon wrote – "Conduct Unbecoming can be viewed with modest pleasure if only for its performances and the cinematography of Bob Huke".

References

Notes

External links
 

1975 films
British historical drama films
British films based on plays
1975 drama films
Films directed by Michael Anderson
Films scored by Stanley Myers
Films set in the British Raj
Films set in the 19th century
British legal films
Military courtroom films
1970s historical drama films
Films shot at Shepperton Studios
British Lion Films films
1970s English-language films
1970s British films